Atomotricha  is a genus of moths of the family Oecophoridae. It was circumscribed in 1883 by Edward Meyrick. The species within this genus are all endemic to New Zealand.

, it consists of the following species:

 Atomotricha chloronota 
 Atomotricha colligatella 
 Atomotricha exsomnis 
 Atomotricha isogama 
 Atomotricha lewisi 
 Atomotricha oeconoma 
 Atomotricha ommatias 
 Atomotricha prospiciens 
 Atomotricha sordida 
 Atomotricha versuta

References

External links

 
 

Oecophoridae
Taxa named by Edward Meyrick